Crashing the Gate: Netroots, Grassroots, and the Rise of People Powered Politics is a book authored by American political bloggers Markos Moulitsas of Daily Kos and Jerome Armstrong of MyDD, published in 2006 by Chelsea Green.

Summary
In this book, the authors document what they see as the ineffectiveness of "old-school politics" in the Democratic Party, and advocate for a "new kind of popular political movement" that combines the netroots, grassroots, labor unions and big donors to effect a "broad change in the political landscape" of the United States.

Publication data
Crashing the Gate: Netroots, Grassroots, and the Rise of People Powered Politics. (2006) Chelsea Green, .

External links
 CrashingTheGate.com - official site
 Chelsea Green's page for Crashing the Gate

Related books
 Taking On the System: Rules for Radical Change in a Digital Era

2006 non-fiction books
Books about politics of the United States